(2,2,6,6-Tetramethylpiperidin-1-yl)oxyl or (2,2,6,6-tetramethylpiperidin-1-yl)oxidanyl, commonly known as TEMPO, is a chemical compound with the formula (CH2)3(CMe2)2NO. This heterocyclic compound is a red-orange, sublimable solid.  As a stable aminoxyl radical, it has applications in chemistry and biochemistry. TEMPO is used as a radical marker, as a structural probe for biological systems in conjunction with electron spin resonance spectroscopy, as a reagent in organic synthesis, and as a mediator in controlled radical polymerization.

Preparation
TEMPO was discovered by Lebedev and Kazarnowskii in 1960.  It is prepared by oxidation of 2,2,6,6-tetramethylpiperidine.

Structure and bonding

The structure has been confirmed by X-ray crystallography. The reactive radical is well shielded by the four methyl groups.

The stability of this radical can be attributed to the delocalization of the radical to form a two-center three-electron N–O bond. The stability is reminiscent of the stability of nitric oxide and nitrogen dioxide. Additional stability is attributed to the steric protection provided by the four methyl groups adjacent to the aminoxyl group. These methyl groups serve as inert substituents, whereas any CH center adjacent to the aminoxyl would be subject to abstraction by the aminoxyl.

Regardless of the reasons for the stability of the radical, the O–H bond in the hydrogenated derivative (the hydroxylamine 1-hydroxy-2,2,6,6-tetramethylpiperidine) TEMPO–H is weak.

Application in organic synthesis

TEMPO is employed in organic synthesis as a catalyst for the oxidation of primary alcohols to aldehydes.  The actual oxidant is the N-oxoammonium salt. In a catalytic cycle with sodium hypochlorite as the stoichiometric oxidant, hypochlorous acid generates  the N-oxoammonium salt from TEMPO.

One typical reaction example is the oxidation of (S)-(−)-2-methyl-1-butanol to (S)-(+)-2-methylbutanal: 4-Methoxyphenethyl alcohol is oxidized to the corresponding carboxylic acid in a system of catalytic TEMPO and sodium hypochlorite and a stoichiometric amount of sodium chlorite. TEMPO oxidations also exhibit chemoselectivity, being inert towards secondary alcohols, but the reagent will convert aldehydes to carboxylic acids.

The oxidation of TEMPO can be highly selective. It has been proven that secondary alcohols are more likely to be oxidized by TEMPO under an acidic environment. The reason is when in this condition, secondary alcohols are more easily able to provide an H- ion.

In cases where secondary oxidizing agents cause side reactions, it is possible to stoichiometrically convert TEMPO to the oxoammonium salt in a separate step. For example, in the oxidation of geraniol to geranial,  4-acetamido-TEMPO is first oxidized to the oxoammonium tetrafluoroborate.

TEMPO can also be employed in nitroxide-mediated radical polymerization (NMP), a controlled free radical polymerization technique that allows better control over the final molecular weight distribution. The TEMPO free radical can be added to the end of a growing polymer chain, creating a "dormant" chain that stops polymerizing. However, the linkage between the polymer chain and TEMPO is weak, and can be broken upon heating, which then allows the polymerization to continue. Thus, the chemist can control the extent of polymerization and also synthesize narrowly distributed polymer chains.

Industrial applications and analogues
TEMPO is sufficiently inexpensive for use on a laboratory scale. There is also industrial-scale manufacturer which can provide TEMPO at a reasonable price in large quantity. Structurally related analogues do exist, which are largely based on 4-hydroxy-TEMPO (TEMPOL). This is produced from acetone and ammonia, via triacetone amine, making it much less expensive. Other alternatives include polymer-supported TEMPO catalysts, which are economic due to their recyclability.

Industrial-scale examples of TEMPO-like compounds include hindered amine light stabilizers and polymerisation inhibitors.

See also
1-Hydroxy-2,2,6,6-tetramethylpiperidine, the reduced derivative of TEMPO
TEMPOL
N-Hydroxyphthalimide

References

External links
 TEMPO

Free radicals
Amine oxides
Piperidines